Flordon is a village and civil parish in the English county of Norfolk.

History
Although the certain meaning of Flordon's name is uncertain, it is of Anglo-Saxon origin and directly translates from Old English as 'floor hill'.

In the Domesday Book, Flordon is listed as a settlement of 48 households in the hundred of Humbleyard. In 1086, the village was part of the East Anglian estates of Bishop Odo of Bayeux, Alan of Brittany, Roger Bigod and Godric the Steward.

Flordon Mill stood in the village from the medieval period until its demolition in the 1920s. The mill was powered by water and stood on a small tributary of the River Tas.

Flordon Hall is a timber framed, seventeenth century manor-house that was built on the ruins of an earlier building.

Geography
According to the 2011 census, Flordon has a population of 281 residents living in 120 households.

Flordon falls within the constituency of South Norfolk and is represented at Parliament by Richard Bacon MP of the Conservative Party. For the purposes of local government, the parish falls within the district of South Norfolk.

Nearby Taswood Lakes operate as a set of public fisheries close to the village, the lakes are mainly used for fishing for Carp.

St. Michael's Church
Flordon's parish church is dedicated to Saint Michael and was largely rebuilt in the nineteenth century on the site of previous worship.

Rainthorpe Hall

Rainthorpe Hall is located within the Parish of Flordon and was built in its current form in the late sixteenth century by the lawyer Thomas Baxter. Today, the hall is a Grade I listed building and is on the Register of Historic Parks and Gardens of Special Historic Interest in England.

Amenities
Tas Valley Mushrooms is based within the parish.

Hethersett and Tas Cricket Club play their home games within the parish boundaries and field four men's teams and one women's team. The First XI competes in the Norfolk Cricket Alliance's Division One, and were placed in second place in the 2022 season.

Transport
Flordon railway station opened in 1849 as a stop on the Great Eastern Main Line between London Liverpool Street and Norwich. The station closed in 1966 as part of the Beeching cuts with the nearest railway station today being Wymondham, for Breckland Line services to Norwich and Cambridge.

Notable residents
 Cdr. Frederick Walpole (1822–1876) – Royal Navy officer and politician

War memorial
Flordon's war memorial takes the form of two brass plaques located inside St. Michael's Church. The memorial lists the following names for the First World War:
 L-Cpl. John F. Hazell (d.1916), Royal Norfolk Regiment
 Pvt. Albert G. Hazell (1892–1917), 2nd Bn., Border Regiment
 Pvt. James Stebbings (1885–1916), 5th (Mounted Rifles) Bn., Canadian Expeditionary Force
 Pvt. Frank H. Smith (1893–1915), 1/5th Bn., Royal Norfolk Regt.
 Pvt. Arthur E. Thompson (1892–1915), 1/5th Bn., Royal Norfolk Regt.
 Pvt. Lewis Brown (1881–1917), 9th Bn., Northumberland Fusiliers
 Pvt. James H. Savory (1899–1918), 5th Bn., Yorkshire Regiment

And, the following for Second World War:
 W/O Burney E. R. Whitehouse DFC (d.1944), No. 7 Squadron RAF
 W/O Granville S. Sharpe DFM (d.1944), No. 97 Squadron RAF

References

External links

Villages in Norfolk
Civil parishes in Norfolk